Ronald Gene Estes (born July 19, 1956) is an American politician, engineer, and farmer who has been the U.S. representative for  since April 2017. A member of the Republican Party, he served as Kansas State Treasurer from 2011 to 2017.

A fifth-generation Kansan, Estes studied engineering and business at Tennessee Technological University. He began his career as a consultant and executive in various manufacturing and service industries. Estes was elected treasurer of Sedgwick County in 2004 and reelected in 2008. He was elected Kansas State Treasurer in 2010 and reelected in 2014. After U.S. Representative Mike Pompeo resigned to become Director of the Central Intelligence Agency, Estes won the special election for the seat and was sworn in on April 25, 2017. He is the dean of Kansas's House delegation.

Early life and education
Estes was born in Topeka, Kansas, and is a fifth-generation Kansan. He earned a Bachelor of Science degree in civil engineering and a Master of Business Administration from Tennessee Technological University, where he was selected for membership in Omicron Delta Kappa - The National Leadership Honor Society.

Career

Business 
Estes worked in consulting and management roles in the aerospace, oil and gas, automotive, and several other manufacturing and service industries, working for several companies, including Andersen Consulting, Procter & Gamble, Koch Industries, and Bombardier Learjet.

County treasurer 
Estes was elected treasurer of Sedgwick County, Kansas, home to Wichita, in 2004, and reelected in 2008. During his political career, he also served as treasurer for the Kansas County Treasurer's Association, and in several posts in the Republican Party, including vice chair of the Kansas Republican Party.

Kansas State Treasurer
Estes ran for Kansas State Treasurer in 2010 against incumbent Democrat Dennis McKinney. Estes was the first statewide elected official from Wichita in two decades. He was reelected in 2014, defeating Carmen Alldritt.

As state treasurer, Estes managed more than $24 billion in public money and he came in under budget by over $600,000. He made it a priority to tell Kansans about unclaimed money, such as funds from forgotten bank accounts. In 2016, Estes said his office had returned $100 million in unclaimed property since 2010.

In the 2016 U.S. presidential election, Estes endorsed Marco Rubio for the Republican nomination in February, before Kansas's presidential caucuses. Estes served in the Electoral College and cast his electoral vote for Donald Trump.

U.S. House of Representatives

Elections

2017 special election

Mike Pompeo, who represented Kansas's 4th congressional district in the United States House of Representatives, resigned on January 23, 2017, to become Director of the Central Intelligence Agency. On February 9, Estes won the Republican nomination to run in the special election to determine Pompeo's successor. Estes won with 66 of 126 votes in a special nominating convention held at Friends University.

The Democratic nominee in the special election was James Thompson, a Wichita lawyer and veteran. Estes was endorsed by many Republicans, including President Donald Trump, Vice President Mike Pence, Senator Ted Cruz, House Speaker Paul Ryan, and Governor Sam Brownback. He was also endorsed by the editorial board of The Wichita Eagle.

The National Republican Congressional Committee contributed $92,000, in part for "inflammatory and false" advertisements supporting Estes, which characterized Thompson as an advocate of taxpayer-funded, late-term abortions, and as an advocate for gender-selection abortion. According to April 10, 2017, fundraising reports, Estes had raised $459,000 to Thompson's $292,000.

Estes won the special election on April 11, 2017, 52.2% to 46%.

2018 regular election

In the 2018 election, Estes was challenged in the primary by a candidate with a similar name, Ron M. Estes. This led to a conundrum as to how the candidates should be distinguished on the ballot, with Kansas Secretary of State Kris Kobach deciding that Ron G. Estes could include the prefix "Rep." on the ballot according to Kansas law, although Ron M. Estes complained that this was unfair. The incumbent won with 81.4% of the vote. In the general election, Estes defeated James Thompson in a rematch with 59.4% of the vote.

Tenure 

Estes was sworn into office on April 25, 2017.

In December 2017, Estes voted for the Tax Cuts and Jobs Act of 2017. In an op-ed for the Wichita Eagle, he said he was "confident it will make a real difference for families and businesses in Kansas", that it would provide economic and job growth, and that workers would see larger paychecks. Estes says the tax-filing process had been simplified, even though the process remains the same.

In July 2017, Estes received national attention for interrupting Representative Kathleen Rice mid-sentence while she asked a question at a Homeland Security subcommittee hearing. Rice tweeted "Day in the life. Worth noting there are men from both parties who don't act like this" and included a video of the exchange. Estes explained that he was simply trying to follow committee rules after Rice's time was up.

Committee assignments
Committee on Ways and Means
 Subcommittee on Social Security
 Subcommittee on Worker and Family Support

Caucus memberships
 Congressional Western Caucus
 Republican Study Committee

Political positions

Abortion
Estes calls himself "proudly pro-life" and supports defunding Planned Parenthood. In the only election debate he attended, where he joined Democrat James Thompson and the campaign manager for Libertarian candidate Chris Rockhold, he repeated the claim that Planned Parenthood had been profiting by selling parts of aborted fetuses.

Economic issues

Estes supports a balanced-budget amendment to the Constitution and reducing corporate and some personal income tax rates.

Health care
During the 2017 special election campaign, Estes said that he believes that the American Health Care Act of 2017 did not go far enough to uproot and eliminate the Affordable Care Act, seeking complete repeal.

Texas v. Pennsylvania
In December 2020, Estes was one of 126 Republican members of the House of Representatives to sign an amicus brief in support of Texas v. Pennsylvania, a lawsuit filed at the United States Supreme Court contesting the results of the 2020 presidential election, in which Joe Biden defeated incumbent Donald Trump. The Supreme Court declined to hear the case on the basis that Texas lacked standing under Article III of the Constitution to challenge the results of an election held by another state.

Personal life
Ron and his wife, Susan, have three children. His family operates a farm in Osage County, Kansas. Susan Estes is a member of the Kansas House of Representatives.

Electoral history

See also 

 United States congressional delegations from Kansas
 2020 Kansas elections

References

External links

 Congressman Ron Estes official U.S. House website
 Ron Estes for Congress campaign website
 
 
 

|-

|-

1956 births
2016 United States presidential electors
21st-century American politicians
Living people
People from Osage County, Kansas
Politicians from Topeka, Kansas
Politicians from Wichita, Kansas
Republican Party members of the United States House of Representatives from Kansas
State treasurers of Kansas
Spouses of Kansas politicians
Tennessee Technological University alumni
Conservatism in the United States